Kushku may refer to:

 Kushku, Fars, the village in Fars Province 
 Kushku, Isfahan, the village in Isfahan Province
 Kushku, Kerman, the city in Kerman Province